Self-assessment is a topic in social psychology.

Self assessment may also refer to:

 A form of educational assessment in which students make judgements about their own work
 A process in which an organization reviews its activities and results against the EFQM Excellence Model
 A kind of tax form used in the United Kingdom